Brandon W.K. Wolff (born October 18, 1975) is an American mixed martial artist and former Navy SEAL, who is perhaps best known for his short stint in the Welterweight division of the Ultimate Fighting Championship nicknamed “Killer Bee”.

Mixed martial arts career
Wolff made his professional MMA debut on January 5, 2002, when he faced David Santiago at Warriors of the New Millennium 4. He won the fight via first-round KO. Following this win, Wolff would compile a professional record of 7–3, with notable fights against UFC veterans Riki Fukuda and Chad Reiner before being signed by the Ultimate Fighting Championship in late 2008.

Ultimate Fighting Championship
In late 2008, Wolff signed with the UFC. He was expected to face Jon Koppenhaver in his debut; however, Koppenhaver would be released from the promotion after refusing to fight Wolff and for his comments on deceased UFC fighter Evan Tanner. Wolff would instead make his debut against Ben Saunders at UFC: Fight for the Troops on December 10, 2008. He lost the fight via first-round TKO (knees).

In his second fight for the promotion, Wolff faced Yoshiyuki Yoshida at UFC 98 on May 23, 2009. He lost the fight via guillotine choke, and was subsequently released from the promotion.

Post-UFC career
In his first fight after his UFC release, Wolff faced Dylan Clay at X-1: Nations Collide on June 14, 2010. He lost the fight via kimura, dropping Wolff to three losses in a row.

Personal life
Before fighting professionally, Wolff was a U.S. Navy SEAL. Wolff graduated from Basic Underwater Demolition/SEAL Training (BUD/S) class 222 in 1999. Following SEAL Tactical Training (STT) and completion of a six-month probationary period, he received the Special Warfare insignia, also known as the "SEAL Trident". He received an honorable discharge in 2001 leaving as a Construction Mechanic Third Class rank. Wolff also has a twin brother, Brenton, who is also a former U.S. Navy SEAL graduated from BUD/S class 223. Wolff, later received his bachelor's degree from American Military University.

Mixed martial arts record

|-
|Loss
|align=center|7–6
|Dylan Clay
|Submission (kimura) 
|X-1 - Nations Collide 
|
|align=center|3
|align=center|4:06
|Honolulu, Hawaii, United States
|
|-
|Loss
|align=center|7–5
|Yoshiyuki Yoshida
|Submission (guillotine choke)
|UFC 98
|
|align=center|1
|align=center|2:24
|Las Vegas, Nevada, United States
|
|-
|Loss
|align=center|7–4
|Ben Saunders
|TKO (knees)
|UFC: Fight for the Troops
|
|align=center|1
|align=center|1:49
|Fayetteville, North Carolina, United States
|
|-
|Win
|align=center|7–3
|Chad Reiner
|Decision (split)
|X-1 - Legends
|
|align=center|5
|align=center|5:00
|Honolulu, Hawaii, United States
|
|-
|Win
|align=center|6–3
|Chad Klingensmith
|Decision (unanimous)
|EliteXC: Uprising
|
|align=center|3
|align=center|5:00
|Honolulu, Hawaii, United States
|
|-
|Win
|align=center|5–3
|Shu Nahiwawa
|TKO (punches)
|X-1 - Grand Prix 2007
|
|align=center|1
|align=center|3:02
|Honolulu, Hawaii, United States
|
|-
|Loss
|align=center|4–3
|Jeffery Painter
|Submission (rear-naked choke)
|Omaha Fight Club 09/29/06
|
|align=center|2
|align=center|0:55
|Omaha, Nebraska, United States
|
|-
|Win
|align=center|4–2
|Josh McDonald
|TKO (doctor stoppage)
|Rumble on the Rock 9
|
|align=center|1
|align=center|5:00
|Honolulu, Hawaii, United States
|
|-
|Loss
|align=center|3–2
|Riki Fukuda
|TKO (punches)
|K-1 World Grand Prix 2005 in Hawaii
|
|align=center|2
|align=center|2:49
|Honolulu, Hawaii, United States
|
|-
|Win
|align=center|3–1
|Jay Carter
|Decision (unanimous)
|ROTR - Proving Grounds
|
|align=center|2
|align=center|5:00
|Hilo, Hawaii, United States
|
|-
|Win
|align=center|2–1
|Hannibal Adofo
|Decision (split)
|WEC 6: Return of a Legend
|
|align=center|3
|align=center|5:00
|Lemoore, California, United States
|
|-
|Loss
|align=center|1–1
|Ian Helms
|Decision (unanimous)
|SuperBrawl 25
|
|align=center|2
|align=center|5:00
|Honolulu, Hawaii, United States
|
|-
|Win
|align=center|1–0
|David Santiago
|KO (punch)
|Warriors of the New Millennium 4
|
|align=center|1
|align=center|3:15
|Lahania, Hawaii, United States
|
|-

References

External links
 
 

American male mixed martial artists
Mixed martial artists from Hawaii
Welterweight mixed martial artists
Living people
1975 births
United States Navy SEALs personnel
United States Navy sailors
Ultimate Fighting Championship male fighters